Rufisque Arrondissement  is an arrondissement of the Rufisque Department in the Dakar Region of Senegal. The principal town is Rufisque.

Arrondissements of Senegal
Dakar Region